Christopher Michael Cillizza (born February 20, 1976) is an American political commentator, who worked for the television news channel CNN from 2017-2022. Prior to joining CNN, he wrote for The Fix, the daily political blog of The Washington Post, and was a regular contributor to the Post on political issues, a frequent panelist on Meet the Press, and an MSNBC political analyst. Cillizza is also a co-host of The Tony Kornheiser Show sports podcast. In April 2017, Cillizza began working for CNN, including writing and onscreen appearances. He was terminated by CNN in December 2022.

Early life and education
Cillizza was born and raised in Marlborough, Connecticut. He attended The Loomis Chaffee School (which he sometimes refers to jokingly as the "Loomis Chaffee School for the Rich," borrowing a line from Tony Kornheiser), an independent boarding school in Windsor, Connecticut, and graduated in 1994. He attended Georgetown University from 1994 to 1998, where he graduated with a B.A. in English. He currently resides in Falls Church, Virginia with his wife and two children. He is of Sicilian and Irish descent.

Career
After working as a novelist and later an intern for conservative writer George Will, Cillizza began his career in journalism. He initially desired to work as a sports writer, but decided that sports "would be less fun" than politics. He later worked on the Washington, D.C. newspaper Roll Call prior to joining The Washington Post. For The Cook Political Report he covered gubernatorial races and southern House races. He wrote a column on politics for Congress Daily. During his four years at Roll Call, which he joined in June 2001, he reported on campaign politics from the presidential to the congressional level, finishing his time at Roll Call as the paper's White House correspondent.

His freelance work has appeared in publications such as The Atlantic Monthly, Washingtonian, and Slate. He has also been a guest on CNN, Fox News Channel and MSNBC. After multiple guest appearances on the network, he was named an MSNBC Political Analyst, a position he resigned when he accepted a position at CNN. He is also a frequent panelist on Meet the Press.

The Fix
Cillizza founded the blog The Fix in 2005 and wrote for it on a regular basis until he joined CNN in 2017. The blog's focus was American electoral politics, with Cillizza commenting on gubernatorial, Congressional and presidential elections. He hosted the weekly Fix live chat. Cilizza also oversaw a monthly trivia contest called "Politics and Pints" at the Washington, D.C. bar Capitol Lounge.

Media
From 2007 to 2008, Cillizza was a co-host of the MySpace/MTV Presidential Dialogues, which hosted John McCain, Barack Obama, and others in a live-streamed, interactive Presidential event series. Cillizza and fellow The Washington Post columnist Dana Milbank appeared in a series of humor videos called Mouthpiece Theater, hosted by The Washington Post. An outcry followed a video in which, during a discussion of the White House "Beer Summit", they chose new brands for a number of people, including "Mad Bitch Beer" for Hillary Clinton. Both men apologized for the video and the series was canceled.

In July 2012, Broadway Books (a division of Penguin Random House) released his book, The Gospel According to the Fix. Written in a blog-like format, it contains lists such as "The 10 Best/Worst Negative Ads", as well as coverage of the "deep personal hatreds that politics provoke" and predictions for the 2012 and 2016 presidential elections.

Since 2014, Cillizza has served a regular co-host of The Tony Kornheiser Show.

CNN
On April 3, 2017, Cillizza joined CNN as a "political reporter and digital editor-at-large," contributing online and on television.

On June 28, 2017, CNN Politics announced the launch of "The Point with Chris Cillizza." According to the official press release, the new "multiplatform brand" will include "daily columns, on-air analysis, an evening newsletter, [a] podcast, and the launch of trivia night events in Washington, DC." The show which is on YouTube releases political analysis videos hosted by Cillizza every Tuesday and Thursday. 

Cillizza also runs political trivia on his personal Instagram account on Mondays, Wednesdays, and Fridays.

On December 1, 2022, Cillizza was laid off from CNN.

Reception
Columbia Journalism Review has described Cillizza's informal, "everyman" style as being popular with readers. According to reviewers, "Chris Cillizza might be the only person in America who can have goofy fun talking about Trumpcare, Russian election interference, and the emoluments clause... Consequently, Cillizza tends to be a fly trap for criticism about his criticism." Jay Rosen has compared his approach to infotainment which turns political analysis into gamesmanship detached from real-world implications. Former CNN host Soledad O'Brien has described Cillizza's work as facile. David Weigel has criticized Cillizza for focusing on predictions rather than factual analysis. Cillizza, along with Mark Halperin and Ron Fournier, was cited by Felix Biederman and Virgil Texas as one of the inspirations for their parody political pundit Carl Diggler.

References

External links

1976 births
21st-century American journalists
21st-century American writers
American comedy writers
American male journalists
Loomis Chaffee School alumni
American online journalists
American political journalists
American political commentators
American political writers
Georgetown College (Georgetown University) alumni
Journalists from Connecticut
Journalists from Virginia
Living people
CNN people
MSNBC people
People from Marlborough, Connecticut
People from Falls Church, Virginia
The Washington Post journalists
Writers from Virginia
Writers from Connecticut
American male bloggers
American bloggers
American people of Italian descent
American people of Irish descent
The Cook Political Report with Amy Walter people